Cat People is a 2021 American Netflix documentary series created by Glen Zipper. The six-part series follows the lives of six different individuals who have built their lives around their pets. It was released on July 1, 2021.

References 
2021 American television series debuts
Netflix original documentary television series
English-language Netflix original programming
2020s American documentary television series
Television series about cats

External links